Evridiki (Vicky) Hadjivassiliou (born: 9 February 1964), also spelling as Hadjivasiliou or Hadjivasileiou, is a Greek author, television presenter and local politician who stood for PASOK in Thessaloniki, Greece.  She was born on 10 February 1971 in Thessaloniki and was raised there with her brother, Phoebus by their father Vassilis and their mother Chryssoula.

Hadjivassiliou wrote various books about healthy diet and tips for long-living as well as many articles for magazines of Athens and Thessaloniki. She currently presents the television show "Pame paketo" (The Package) on Alpha TV.

She is married to Ioannis Akkas and together they have two sons, Christos and Orfeus.

Filmography

Television

Film

References

Living people
Greek television presenters
Greek women television presenters
Year of birth missing (living people)
People from Kilkis